1 Samuel 10 is the tenth chapter of the First Book of Samuel in the Old Testament of the Christian Bible or the first part of the Books of Samuel in the Hebrew Bible. According to Jewish tradition  the book was attributed to the prophet Samuel, with additions by the prophets Gad and Nathan, but modern scholars view it as a composition of a number of independent texts of various ages from c. 630–540 BCE. This chapter describes the anointing of Saul as the first king of Israel, within a section comprising 1 Samuel 7–15 which records the rise of the monarchy in Israel and the account of the first years of King Saul.

Text 
This chapter was originally written in the Hebrew language. It is divided into 27 verses.

Textual witnesses 
Some early manuscripts containing the text of this chapter in Hebrew are of the Masoretic Text tradition, which includes the Codex Cairensis (895), Aleppo Codex (10th century), and Codex Leningradensis (1008). Fragments containing parts of this chapter in Hebrew were found among the Dead Sea Scrolls including 4Q51 (4QSam; 100–50 BCE) with extant verses 3–12, 14, 16, 18, 24–27.

Extant ancient manuscripts of a translation into Koine Greek known as the Septuagint (originally was made in the last few centuries BCE) include Codex Vaticanus (B; B; 4th century) and Codex Alexandrinus (A; A; 5th century).

Places 

Bethel
Gibeah]
Gilgal
Mizpah
Ramah
Tabor

Samuel anoints Saul (10:1–16) 

 Verse 1 Then Samuel took a flask of oil and poured it on his head, and kissed him and said: “Is it not because the Lord has anointed you commander over His inheritance?""Flask of oil" (KJV: "vial of oil"): not using a "horn of oil" as in the cases of David and Solomon (cf. 1 Samuel 2:10), only one other king, Jehu, was anointed like Saul, and similarly, although also initiated by YHWH, their reigns were far from ideal.
"Inheritance": according to Masoretic Text, Targum and Vulgate, whereas Septuagint has "people Israel; and you shall rule the people of the Lord", followed in Septuagint and Vulgate with "And you shall deliver His people from the hands of their enemies all around them. And this shall be a sign to you, that God has anointed you to be a prince."

 Saul proclaimed king of Israel (10:17–27) 
This section can be considered the continuation of the narrative in 1 Samuel 8:1–22 that the previously dismissed assembly was at this time reconvened to appoint a king. Samuel started by saying a judgement oracle (verses17–19) that the people chose to reject God and elect a king, despite God's continuous protection and ability to deliver them. The election by lot was used elsewhere to find a hidden offender (Joshua 7; 1 Samuel 14:38-44), but this time, it is to confirm that Saul was God's choice, which was also acclaimed because of Saul's stature (verses 21b–27; cf. 1 Samuel 9:2). YHWH's displeasure with the people's request to have a king
did not make Saul's election invalid. The public acclamation of Saul (verse 24), an important element in a king's installation (cf. 1 Kings 1:25, 34, 39; 2 Kings 11:12), was followed by the reading of the rights and duties of the kingship (cf. 1 Samuel 8:11–18; Deuteronomy 17:18–20), establishing the 'subjugation of the monarchy to prophetic authority'.

 Verse 24 And Samuel said to all the people, "Do you see him whom the Lord has chosen, that there is no one like him among all the people?"So all the people shouted and said, "Long live the king!""Long live the king": from Hebrew which means "May the king live".

 Verse 25 Then Samuel told the people the manner of the kingdom, and wrote it in a book, and laid it up before the Lord. And Samuel sent all the people away, every man to his house."The manner of the kingdom": probably refers to the regulations related to kingship given to Moses in Deuteronomy 17:14–20.

 Verse 27 But some worthless fellows said, “How can this man save us?” And they despised him and brought him no present. But he held his peace.''
"Worthless fellows" (KJV: "children of Belial"): literally "sons of worthlessness" (cf. 1 Samuel 2:12).
"He held his peace": or "Saul kept silent". Septuagint has an addition "after about a month" after this statement, which is supported by a hand correction of a manuscript among Dead Sea Scrolls.

See also 

Related Bible parts: 1 Samuel 2, 1 Samuel 8, 1 Samuel 9, 1 Samuel 11

Notes

References

Sources

Commentaries on Samuel

General

External links 
 Jewish translations:
 Shmuel I – I Samuel – Chapter 10 (Judaica Press). Hebrew text and English translation [with Rashi's commentary] at Chabad.org
 Christian translations:
 Online Bible at GospelHall.org (ESV, KJV, Darby, American Standard Version, Bible in Basic English)
 1 Samuel chapter 10. Bible Gateway

10